A shoulder tap is an act in which a minor asks an adult to purchase alcohol for the minor. The definition of minor and adult vary by jurisdiction depending on the drinking age, but is usually between ages 18–21. Typically, the minor will walk around a convenience store and solicit help from a passing adult stranger. This is also commonly known as a "Hey Mister". A Los Angeles Police Department survey indicated that almost half of minors who attempt to acquire alcohol use this 
method. Such communities use sting operations to deter adult assistance and promote awareness of the legal consequences of helping minors obtain alcohol.

In 2001, a Mothers Against Drunk Driving (MADD) chapter conducted a small unscientific study in Massachusetts, in which teens stood in front of 15 stores and asked 100 adults apparently over the age of 21 to buy them alcohol. 83 of the adults refused and 17 agreed.

In Central Scotland the practice is commonly referred to as a "jump-in".

A Midwestern variation on the shoulder tap is for minors to question whether or not a chosen person of age would purchase alcohol for them. Conversationally, the game takes the form of "Would (person) buy for us?" The person can be a friend, acquaintance, family member, stranger, historical figure or celebrity. This game can be imaginative and speculative in nature and just for fun, or the player(s) can actually begin the process of seeking people who can realistically acquire alcohol for them.

References

Alcohol law
Juvenile law